Edertal is a municipality in Waldeck-Frankenberg in northern Hesse, Germany.

Geography

Location
Edertal lies roughly 30 km in a straight line southwest of Kassel. It is on the north and northwest edges of the Kellerwald range and stretches to the south shore of the Edersee and south and southwest of its dam. It lies at the eastern edge of the Kellerwald-Edersee National Park, a small part of which is inside municipal limits.

The community of Edertal is crossed by the river Eder, the biggest body of flowing water in the community, from northwest to southeast. Into this empties the Wesebach at the constituent community of Giflitz. The Affolderner See, which is found within municipal limits, is another reservoir used as lower reservoir for the Waldeck Pumped Storage Station (one of Germany's largest hydro power stations) and for recreation.

On the whole, hydroelectric use at the Edersee is also well developed.

Neighbouring communities
Edertal borders in the north on the town of Waldeck, in the east on the towns of Naumburg (Kassel district) and Fritzlar (Schwalm-Eder-Kreis), in the south on the town of Bad Wildungen, and in the west on the town of Frankenau and the community of Vöhl (all three in Waldeck-Frankenberg).

Constituent communities
In Giflitz is the community's administrative seat. With the neighbouring centre of Bergheim to the northeast, it forms the heart of the community and, accordingly, a lower centre in the Regional Plan (in terms of Walter Christaller's Central Place Theory).

The community of Edertal consists of the following centres:

Bringhausen was one of three villages that originally stood where the Edersee is now. It was relocated to higher ground early in the 20th century.

Geology
The area belongs to the foothills of the Rhenish Slate Mountains. Outcrops here are mainly shale and greywacke.

Politics

Municipal council
Edertal's council is made up of 31 councillors, with seats apportioned thus, in accordance with municipal elections held on 26 March 2006:

Note: FWG is a citizens' coalition.
Elections in March 2016:
CDU: 6
SPD: 10
Greens: 3
FDP:    3
FW:     6
WIR:    3

Mayor
In November 2012 Klaus Gier (independent) was elected the new mayor.

References

External links

 

Waldeck-Frankenberg
Principality of Waldeck and Pyrmont